This page details the match results and statistics of the New Zealand national football team from its first match in 1922 until the second match against Israel in 1969.

Key

Key to matches
Att. = Match attendance
(H) = Home ground
(A) = Away ground
(N) = Neutral ground

Key to record by opponent
Pld = Games played
W = Games won
D = Games drawn
L = Games lost
GF = Goals for
GA = Goals against

A-International results
New Zealand's score is shown first in each case.

Best/worst results

Streaks
Most wins in a row
7, 31 August 1958–4 June 1962
6, 30 September 1951–16 September 1952
Most matches without a loss
9, 30 September 1951–14 August 1954
Most losses in a row
16, 23 July 1927–19 September 1951
Most matches without a win
16, 23 July 1927–19 September 1951

Results by opposition

Results by year

See also
New Zealand national football team
New Zealand at the FIFA World Cup
New Zealand at the FIFA Confederations Cup
New Zealand at the OFC Nations Cup

References

1922–69